It Came From N.Y.C. is a three-disc or five-LP anthology of the band White Zombie, released on June 3, 2016, by The Numero Group. It collects all the material the group officially released between 1985 and 1989, including previously unreleased tracks from the Pig Heaven/Slaughter the Grey sessions. The audio was remastered by guitarist Jay Yuenger and the box set includes a one-hundred and eight page book comprising unpublished photos, anecdotes by the band and a twenty-thousand-word essay written by Pitchfork contributor Grayson Currin.

Critical reception

In writing for Pitchfork Media, Evan Minsker praised the staying power of the material, saying "This music pummels, and better still, it escapes the trap of self-seriousness that so many metal and noise bands seem to fall into. They had a sense of humor, which came through in their use of samples and in Zombie's deranged carnival barker performances." Awarding the set four out of five stars, Stephen Thomas Erlewine of AllMusic wrote that "The music itself feels somewhat cemented to time, but that's also its appeal: this was a band that came from a very specific time and place, and that era is celebrated here, providing an interesting footnote in '80s underground history."

Track listing

Personnel
Adapted from the It Came From N.Y.C. liner notes.

White Zombie
 Tom Guay – electric guitar (1.13-1.19, 2.1-2.10)
 Paul Kostabi – electric guitar (1.1-1.6)
 Peter Landau – drums (1.1-1.6)
 Tim Jeffs – electric guitar (1.7-1.12)
 Ivan de Prume – drums (1.7-1.19, 2.1-2.10, 3.1-3.10)
 John Ricci – electric guitar (3.1-3.7)
 Sean Yseult – bass guitar
 Jay Yuenger – electric guitar (3.8-3.10), remastering
 Rob Zombie – vocals

Production and additional personnel
 J.Z. Barrell – engineering (1.7-1.12)
 Martin Bisi – engineering and mixing (3.1-3.7)
 Gary Dorfman – engineering (1.1-1.6)
 Oz Fritz – assistant engineering (3.1-3.7)
 Greg Gordon – engineering (3.8-3.10)
 Kramer – engineering (1.13-1.19)
 Bill Laswell – production (3.1-3.7)
 Robert Musso – additional engineering (3.1-3.7)
 Daniel Rey – production (3.8-3.10)
 Warren Shaw – assistant engineering (3.8-3.10)
 Nicky Skopelitis – programming (3.1-3.7)
 Artie Smith – technician (3.1-3.7)
 Wharton Tiers – production and engineering (2.1-2.10)
 White Zombie – production (1.1-1.19, 2.1-2.10)

Release history

References

External links 
 
 It Came From N.Y.C. at The Numero Group

White Zombie (band) albums
2016 compilation albums
The Numero Group compilation albums